T. inornatus may refer to:
 Tasmanoonops inornatus, a spider species in the genus Tasmanonops and the family Orsolobidae
 Tornatellides inornatus, a gastropod species in the genus Tornatellides
 Toxorhynchites inornatus, a mosquito species in the genus Toxorhynchites
 Triaenobunus inornatus, a harvestman species in the genus Triaenobunis and the family Triaenonychidae
 Typhlops inornatus, a snake species

See also
 Inornatus